Farkhutdinov or Farkhoutdinov is a Russian masculine surname of Tatar origin, its feminine counterpart is Farkhutdinova or Farkhoutdinova. It may refer to
Bakir Farkhutdinov (1925–2008), Russian weightlifter
Igor Farkhutdinov (1950–2003), Russian statesman, governor of Sakhalin Oblast
Rinat Farkhoutdinov (born 1975), Russian ice dancer

Russian-language surnames